Campiglossa dirlbekorum is a species of tephritid or fruit flies in the genus Campiglossa of the family Tephritidae.

Distribution
The species is found in Mongolia.

References

Tephritinae
Insects described in 1999
Diptera of Europe